Amanda Jacqueline Redman,  (born 12 August 1957) is an English actress, known for her roles as Detective Superintendent Sandra Pullman in the BBC One series New Tricks (2003–2013) and as Dr. Lydia Fonseca in The Good Karma Hospital (2017–2022). She gained BAFTA TV Award nominations for At Home with the Braithwaites (2000–2003) and Tommy Cooper: Not Like That, Like This (2014). Her film roles include For Queen and Country (1988), Sexy Beast (2000) and Mike Bassett: England Manager (2001).

Early life
Redman was born in Brighton, Sussex. Her father, Ronald Jack Redman (1929–1980), was born in Camberwell, London to parents from the East End, and her mother, Joan Beryl Redman (née Herrington, 1927–2014), was born in India to William Herrington, a British Indian Army soldier. Redman's father died at the age of 51, when she was 23. Redman had one brother, who died of pneumonia in 2008.

Redman is badly scarred on her left arm as a result of an accident when she was 18 months old. She was scalded by a pan of boiling-hot turkey-and-vegetable soup and suffered burns to 75% of her body. Her arm was the only part of her body permanently affected, but the trauma was so severe that she was pronounced clinically dead at the Queen Victoria Hospital in East Grinstead, Sussex.

Career
Redman trained at the Bristol Old Vic Theatre School. She was in the same class as Daniel Day-Lewis and Miranda Richardson.

In 1984, she appeared as Marina in the BBC Shakespeare production of Pericles, Prince of Tyre opposite Mike Gwilym. She also played Maxine in Oxbridge Blues, a British television mini-series, produced by the BBC and first shown in 1984 written by Frederick Raphael. In 1985 she played Janet in the touring version of The Rocky Horror Show.

In 1986, she played Miss Fairfax (Gwendolen) in the BBC Drama production of The Importance of Being Earnest by Oscar Wilde.

She played opposite Liv Ullmann in Richard's Things (1980), took over from Alfred Molina in the 1990s comedy drama El C.I.D., playing a new female lead in the series, and played Diana Dors in the TV film The Blonde Bombshell (1999). She presented an MTV show on satellite TV in the 1990s. She co-starred in the first two series of Dangerfield in 1995, playing Joanna Stevens, and played a role in Taggart the same year. In 2000 she played Deedee Dove in the feature film Sexy Beast. From 2000 until 2003 she played Alison Braithwaite, a woman whose life is turned upside down after she wins the lottery, in ITV's At Home with the Braithwaites.

From 2003 to 2013, Redman took the role of DSI Sandra Pullman in the BBC's New Tricks.  In July 2013, she announced her departure; Tamzin Outhwaite replaced her.

In June 2006, Redman performed in Children's Party at the Palace as Cruella DeVil for the Queen's 80th birthday, and was the subject of an episode of the BBC documentary series Who Do You Think You Are?, a programme that explored her family history.

In 2015, Redman played the role of Jackie Rose in the three-part ITV drama The Trials of Jimmy Rose, starring alongside Ray Winstone. From 2017, she played Lydia Fonseca in the ITV drama series  The Good Karma Hospital.

Redman is the founder and principal of the Artists Theatre School. She directs an annual show which is performed at The Questors Theatre in Ealing.

In 2018, she became a patron of Brighton Open Air Theatre. She told the Brighton Argus:

Awards and nominations
 2001 – Nominated – BAFTA TV Award – Best Actress for At Home with the Braithwaites 
 2002 –  Winner –  Chlotrudis Award –  Best Actress for Sexy Beast 
 2003 – Nominated – National Television Award – Most Popular Actress for At Home with the Braithwaites 
 2007 – Nominated – TV Quick Award – Best Actress for New Tricks 
 2008 – Nominated –  Crime Thriller Award –  Best Actress for New Tricks
 2015 – Nominated – BAFTA TV Award – Best Supporting Actress for Tommy Cooper: Not Like That, Like This
2016 – Winner – New York Festivals International TV and Film Awards – Best Actress for The Trials of Jimmy Rose

Personal life
Redman married actor Robert Glenister in 1984; they had one child together, daughter Emily, before divorcing in 1992. Redman is credited with encouraging her then-brother-in-law, Philip Glenister, to go to drama school and pursue acting; he has played DCI Gene Hunt in both Life on Mars and Ashes to Ashes.

Redman was appointed a Member of the Order of the British Empire (MBE) in the 2012 Birthday Honours for services to drama and charity.

Filmography

Theatre

References

External links
Amanda Redman on Twitter
 
 Artists Theatre School

1957 births
Living people
20th-century English actresses
21st-century English actresses
Actresses from Brighton
Alumni of Bristol Old Vic Theatre School
English film actresses
English television actresses
English people of Irish descent
Members of the Order of the British Empire
People from Brighton
Glenister acting family